A letter collection consists of a publication, usually a book, containing a compilation of letters written by a real person. Unlike an epistolary novel, a letter collection belongs to non-fiction literature. As a publication, a letter collection is distinct from an archive, which is a repository of original documents.

Usually, the original letters are written over the course of the lifetime of an important individual, noted either for their social position or their intellectual influence, and consist of messages to specific recipients. They might also be open letters intended for a broad audience. After these letters have served their original purpose, a letter collection gathers them to be republished as a group. Letter collections, as a form of life writing, serve a biographical purpose. They also typically select and organize the letters to serve an aesthetic or didactic aim, as in literary belles-lettres and religious epistles. The editor who chooses, organizes, and sometimes alters the letters plays a major role in the interpretation of the published collection. Letter collections have existed as a form of literature in most times and places where letter-writing played a prominent part of public life. Before the invention of printing, letter collections were recopied and circulated as manuscripts, like all literature.

Letter collections in history

Antiquity
In ancient Greece, Cicero (106 – 43 BC) is known for his Letters to Atticus, to Brutus, to friends, and to his brother. Seneca the Younger (c. 5 – 65 CE) and Pliny the Younger (c. 61 – c. 112 CE) both published their own letters. Seneca's Letters to Lucilius are strongly moralizing. Pliny's Epistulae have a self-consciously literary style. Ancient letter collections typically did not organize the letters chronologically.

Early Christianity is also associated with collected and published letters, typically referred to as epistles for their didactic focus. Paul the Apostle (c. 5 – c. 64/67 CE) is known for the Pauline epistles which make up thirteen books of the New Testament. Saint Augustine (354 – 430 CE) and Saint Jerome (c. 342-347 – 420 CE) also wrote prolific and influential theological letters.

Medieval and Renaissance Europe 
Medieval European letter-writers were heavily influenced by Cicero in the development of rhetorical conventions (ars dictaminis) for letter-writing.

Petrarch (1304 – 1374 CE) added a greater level of personal autobiographical detail in his Epistolae familiares. Erasmus (1466 –1536 CE) and Justus Lipsius (1547 – 1606 CE) also promoted flexibility and enjoyable reading in letter-writing, rather than a rule-focused formula.

Eighteenth-century Europe 
Published letters and diaries were particularly prominent in eighteenth-century British print, sometimes called "the defining genres of the period." Many works were written an epistolary style without having been mailed as real letters: these included scholarly research and travel narratives, as well as epistolary novels. The term "familiar letters" designated letter collections consisting of authentic correspondence which had been written for a private audience prior to publication. Familiar letters were "informal and autobiographical," and letter collections were praised for how well they could demonstrate the personal character of the author.

Stylistically, eighteenth-century familiar letters were influenced more by the amusing Vincent Voiture (1597 – 1648) than the formal classics of Cicero, Pliny, and Seneca. The letters of Marie de Rabutin-Chantal (1626 – 1696) and her daughter were published beginning in 1725, and widely regarded across Europe as the model for witty, enjoyable letters.

See also
Letter
Autobiography
Biography
Epistle
Epistolography
Epistolary novel
Epistolary poem
Belles-lettres
List of fictional diaries

References

 
Letters (message)
Non-fiction genres